Alenia Marconi Systems (AMS) was a major European integrated defence electronics company and an equal shares joint venture between BAE Systems and Finmeccanica (now Leonardo S.p.A.) until its dissolution on 3 May 2005.

AMS was formed in 1998 by the merger of GEC-Marconi Radar and Defence Systems and Alenia Difesa. Equal shares in the resulting company were then held by Finmeccanica, and GEC-Marconi (later Marconi Electronic Systems (MES)), a division of The General Electric Company (GEC).

With the demerger and subsequent sale of its MES division in 1999, GEC's interest in AMS passed to BAE Systems.

In 2001 AMS' missile systems division was merged with Aerospatiale Matra Missiles and Matra BAe Dynamics to form MBDA.

On 7 October 2003 the UK holding company for AMS changed its registered name from Alenia Marconi Systems Limited to AMS Limited to comply with the agreements reached regarding use of the name "Marconi" following the sale of Marconi Electronic Systems by GEC (later Marconi plc). This name change was reflected in rebranding across the company, although the Italian holding company retained the name Alenia Marconi Systems SpA.

On 28 January 2005 BAE Systems and Finmeccanica announced the intention to dissolve their partnership in the AMS joint venture with AMS' UK and Italian operations taken over by the respective partners as arranged through the Eurosystems Transaction. On 3 May 2005 the Eurosystems Transaction was finalised:
The UK operations of AMS (minus air traffic control and communication systems) brought together with the C4ISR division of BAE Systems (minus communication systems) to form the new BAE Systems Integrated System Technologies (Insyte) division of BAE Systems.
The Italian operations of AMS (Alenia Marconi Systems SpA) became SELEX Sistemi Integrati which in turn became Selex ES in January 2013.

Products 
Air traffic control
Air defence systems
Airport infrastructure
Lighting
Meteorological systems
Command and control (C²)
Communication systems
Data links
Simulators etc.
Aerospace
Military
Radar - Civil and military
Ground
Naval

See also 
Alenia Aeronautica
Alenia Difesa
Alenia Spazio

References

External links 
BBC News: Defence merger on the radar (formation)
BAE Systems website
Leonardo website
"Forty Years of Marconi Radar from 1946 to 1986", GEC Review, Volume 13, No. 3, 1998

Defence companies of Italy
Defence companies of the United Kingdom
Guglielmo Marconi
Guided missile manufacturers
Technology companies established in 1998
Technology companies disestablished in 2005

it:Alenia Marconi Systems